Hollandia was a ship of the Dutch East India Company (Dutch: Vereenigde Oost-Indische Compagnie; VOC) which, on her maiden voyage, was wrecked on Gunner Rock, west of Annet, Isles of Scilly on 13 July 1743 causing 306 fatalities (276 sailors and soldiers and 30 passengers). The wreck was discovered in 1971 by Rex Cowan, a London attorney.

History
On 3 July 1743 she left Texel as part of a Batavia bound fleet carrying a large amount of trade coin and several important passengers. On 13 July 1743 she became separated from the fleet and struck Gunner Rock near Annet, Isles of Scilly in the early hours of the morning, sinking nearby with the loss of all hands.

Salvage
Rex Cowan began his search for Hollandia in 1968, starting with Dutch and English archives and using advanced (for the time) equipment such as a proton magnetometer, finally locating the wreck on 16 September 1971. A large quantity of coins was recovered, as well as bronze cannons and mortars.

References

External links
 Hollandia on wrecksite

Age of Sail merchant ships of the Dutch Republic
Cornish shipwrecks
Maritime incidents in 1743
Ships of the Dutch East India Company
Shipwrecks of the Isles of Scilly